A by-election was held for the New South Wales Legislative Assembly electorate of Ashfield on 9 November 1946 because of the resignation of Athol Richardson to contest the federal seat of Parkes at the 1946 election. Richardson was narrowly defeated, and nominated as a candidate to regain the seat.

Dates

Result

Athol Richardson had resigned to contest the federal seat of Parkes at the 1946 election. When he was unsuccessful he then re-contested Ashfield.

See also
Electoral results for the district of Ashfield
List of New South Wales state by-elections

References

1946 elections in Australia
New South Wales state by-elections
1940s in New South Wales
November 1946 events in Australia